The Illawarra Hawks (formerly the Wollongong Hawks and The Hawks) is an Australian professional basketball team based in Wollongong, New South Wales. The Illawarra Hawks compete in the National Basketball League (NBL) and play their home games at WIN Entertainment Centre, known colloquially as "The Sandpit". The Illawarra Hawks are the only remaining NBL team to have competed in every season since the league's inception in 1979. The team won their first and so far only NBL Championship in 2001 and finished as runners-up in 2005, 2010 and 2017.

History 

The team began as the Illawarra Hawks in the New South Wales Men's Division 1 championship before joining the National Basketball League (NBL) for its inaugural season in 1979. The Hawks played out of Beaton Park Stadium, commonly known as "The Snakepit". In 1981, import Mike Jones was named NBL Most Valuable Player. In 1987, the Hawks had their best season to date, finishing in third place with a 20–6 record.

In 1998, the team was renamed the Wollongong Hawks and moved into WIN Entertainment Centre, known as the Sandpit, with Beaton Park remaining as their office and training facility. The venue is also home to Basketball Illawarra's representative side, also known as the 'Illawarra Hawks'. There is no official relationship between Basketball Illawarra and the NBL side anymore despite sharing the Snakepit.

The 2000/01 season marked history for the Hawks as they won their maiden NBL Championship. Prior to the start of the season, coach Brendan Joyce changed almost half his roster, adding Charles Thomas, Damon Lowery, Grant Kruger, Matt Shanahan and Axel Dench. After finishing the regular season in fourth with a club-best 21 wins from 28 games, Wollongong upset Perth in the first round of the post-season before conquering Adelaide when Lowery sunk three free throws with no time on the clock in game three of the semi-final series. The Hawks went on to beat Townsville 2–1 in the grand final to capture the team's only title.

The Hawks returned to the NBL Grand Final in 2004/05, where they lost to the Sydney Kings.

In February 2009, captain Mat Campbell started the "Save the Hawks" campaign after the ownership group declared the team would not be able to join revamped league in 2009/10 on financial grounds. Campbell and his small team reached their goal, thanks to the commitment of the Illawarra community, naming rights sponsor ahm Health Insurance, and a bank guarantee provided by Indian mining magnate Mr. Arun Jagatramka from Gujarat NRE. A not-for-profit community-based company formed as Wollongong Hawks Basketball Limited was established to operate the Hawks into the future.

In 2009/10, they made their third appearance in the grand final series, this time coming up short to the Perth Wildcats. In 2010/11, import Gary Ervin was named MVP of the league, becoming the first Hawk to win the award since Mike Jones in 1981. In 2013/14, import Rotnei Clarke was named MVP of the league, becoming the third Hawk to win the award.

In July 2014, a new era was ushered in by the Hawks after Telecommunications entrepreneur James Spenceley was successful in his bid to become the organisation's new owner. However, following a dismal 2014/15 season, the organisation was dealt a substantial off-court blow with Wollongong Coal withdrawing their major sponsorship 1½ years into a five-year contract. The Hawks subsequently decided to place themselves into Voluntary Administration on 2 March 2015. On 25 March 2015, the Hawks secured Multi Civil and Rail as their major sponsor, as the company committed to a one-year deal.

On 22 June 2015, the organisation announced that the team would revert to its original name, the Illawarra Hawks, to better reflect not only the city of Wollongong, but also the surrounding area including the city of Shellharbour, the town of Kiama and the Wingecarribee Shire.

Following long-time coach Gordie McLeod's departure, Rob Beveridge was signed as head coach for the 2015/16 season. He nabbed the trio of New Zealand sharp shooter Kirk Penney, big man AJ Ogilvy, and US point guard Kevin Lisch. The trio were dubbed "the three-headed monster", but they were unsuccessful in leading the Hawks to a championship, falling short in the semi-finals. Lisch was named MVP of the league, becoming the fourth Hawk to win the award.

With Lisch and Penney departing after one season, the Hawks reacquired the serves of Rotnei Clarke for the 2016/17 season. He helped them reach the NBL Grand Final for the first time since 2010, where they were defeated 3–0 by the Perth Wildcats.

On 17 June 2019, high school phenom LaMelo Ball announced on ESPN's The Jump that he will sign with the Illawarra Hawks. Ball became the second high school phenom to enter the NBL's Next Stars program for the 2019–20 NBL season, with R. J. Hampton of the New Zealand Breakers being the first. The pair played against each other on 24 October 2019, with the game between the Hawks and the New Zealand Breakers becoming the most watched game in NBL history with nearly two million views globally on Facebook.

In April 2020, the NBL took back the licence for the Illawarra Hawks after the club was placed into voluntary administration. In May 2020, creditors voted to liquidate the Hawks, but the NBL vowed to keep club alive. On 17 June 2020 the NBL announced that Dorry Kordahi, Bryan Colangelo and Michael Proctor had been awarded the license for the club.

Under the agreement with the new ownership, the team was renamed The Hawks, in an effort to broaden the team's appeal in New South Wales. The NBL faced fierce backlash to the decision to strip the Illawarra name, and in February 2021 the NBL agreed to allow the club to be renamed the Illawarra Hawks after a successful campaign by the new owners to boost membership and corporate support.

In the 2022–23 season, the Hawks had four imports suffer season-ending injuries: Justin Robinson, George King, Peyton Siva and Michael Frazier II.

Name, logo and uniforms  
The team's colours are red and white. The logo consists of a red hawk with large centred text of "Hawks". The Hawk is holding a basketball in its talons. Predominately black uniforms are used for home games, and predominantly white uniforms for away games.

Home arenas 
The Hawks play their home games at WIN Entertainment Centre, Wollongong, which holds a capacity of 6,000 seats when in full basketball format. The Hawks are the only full-time tenants at the arena and have been playing at the arena since the 1998–99 NBL season.

Prior to this season, the Hawks played out of the 2,000 seat Beaton Park Stadium (also known as the Illawarra Basketball Stadium) for twenty seasons starting from the club's inception in 1979. One story that evolved around the NBL during the 1980s was that the Illawarra Steelers rugby league team would sit behind the opposition bench during Hawks home games at Beaton Park in a bid to intimidate the opposing team. The Hawks continue to use the stadium as a training facility and also play some pre-season games there.

The Hawks record home attendance of 5,839 was set on 18 February 2005 against the Sydney Kings at the WIN Entertainment Centre during Round 21 of the 2004–05 NBL season.

 Beaton Park Stadium (1979–1998)
 WIN Entertainment Centre (1998–present)

Retired jerseys 

Source: Retired Numbers

Current roster

Notable players 

  David Andersen
  LaMelo Ball
  Adam Ballinger
  Todd Blanchfield
  Josh Boone
  Ray Borner
  Aaron Brooks
  C. J. Bruton
  Mat Campbell
  Adam Caporn
  Rotnei Clarke
  Tim Coenraad
  Demitrius Conger
  Mark Dalton
  Larry Davidson
  Adris De León
  Tyson Demos
  Axel Dench
  Cody Ellis
  Gary Ervin
  Oscar Forman
  Casey Frank
  Sam Froling
  Cortez Groves
  Tyler Harvey
  Darington Hobson
  Greg Hubbard
  Cedric Jackson
  Daniel Jackson
  Mike Jones
  Nick Kay
  Jeremy Kench
  Kevin Lisch
  Rhys Martin
  Mangok Mathiang
  Tywain McKee
  Gordon McLeod
 / Darnell Mee
  Todd Mundt
  Luke Nevill
  Mitch Norton
  Andrew Ogilvy
  Doug Overton
  Kirk Penney
  Anthony Petrie
  Duop Reath
  Cameron Rigby
  Glen Saville
  Matt Shanahan
  Justin Simon
  Jim Slacke
  Lindsay Tait
  Charles Thomas
  Kevin Tiggs
  Cameron Tragardh
  Jarrad Weeks
  Kevin White
  Justin Withers

Coaches 
There have been twelve different head coaches for the Hawks during their history. Charlie Ammit was the first coach of the Hawks to take the team to a finals series when his side finished fourth in the regular season with a 13–11 record. Brendan Joyce was the first coach to both win the Championship (in 2000–01) and claim runners-up (in 2004–05). He was also the first coach to claim runners-up in the regular season (in 2003–04). Both Joyce (2004–05) and Gordie McLeod (2009–10) have the unfortunate honour of claiming the runners-up prize in both the regular season and finals series in the same year. Eric Cooks became the first captain of the club (1999–00) to also become a coach (2006–2009). McLeod is the only other captain (1980–1982 and 1984–1988) to have accomplished this when took over from Cooks in 2009.

Season by season

Source:

Trophies and awards

Trophies 
National Basketball League (NBL)
Championships (1): 2001
Grand Final Appearances (4): 2001, 2005, 2010, 2017
Finals Appearances (22): 1984, 1986, 1987, 1992, 1993, 1994, 1995, 1998, 1998–99, 2000–01, 2001–02, 2002–03, 2003–04, 2004–05, 2005–06, 2009–10, 2012–13, 2013–14, 2015–16, 2016–17, 2020–21, 2021–22

Awards  

NBL MVP
 Mike Jones – 1981
 Gary Ervin – 2011
 Rotnei Clarke – 2014
 Kevin Lisch – 2016
NBL Grand Final MVP
 Glen Saville – 2001
NBL Coach of the Year Award
 David Lindstrom – 1987
 Alan Black – 1993, 1995
 Brendan Joyce – 1999, 2001
 Gordie McLeod – 2010, 2014

NBL Rookie of the Year Award
 Greg Hubbard – 1987
 Justin Withers – 1989
 Axel Dench – 2001
 LaMelo Ball – 2020
NBL Best Defensive Player Award
 Glen Saville – 2003
 Darnell Mee – 2005
 Kevin Lisch – 2016
 Justin Simon – 2021
 Antonius Cleveland – 2022
NBL Most Improved Player Award
 C. J. Bruton – 1999
 Cameron Tragardh – 2008
 Oscar Forman – 2011
 Sam Froling – 2021

NBL Best Sixth Man Award
 Adris Deleon – 2013
 Kevin Tiggs – 2014
 Rotnei Clarke – 2017

All-NBL First Team
 Doug Overton – 1992
 Melvin Thomas – 1993
 Darnell Mee – 2005
 Cortez Groves – 2006
 Tywain McKee – 2010
 Gary Ervin – 2011
 Rotnei Clarke – 2014
 Kevin Lisch – 2016
 Andrew Ogilvy – 2016, 2017
 Demitrius Conger – 2018
 Tyler Harvey – 2021
 Antonius Cleveland – 2022
All-NBL Second Team
 Glen Saville – 2003, 2004, 2005, 2009, 2011
 Cortez Groves – 2007
 Kirk Penney – 2016
All-NBL Third Team
 Glen Saville – 2001, 2006, 2010
 Melvin Thomas – 2001
 Cortez Groves – 2003
 Darnell Mee – 2004
 Adam Ballinger – 2007
 Kavossy Franklin – 2008
 Larry Davidson – 2010
 Cameron Tragardh – 2010

Source: NBL AWARD WINNERS

Records and statistics

References

External links 

 

 
National Basketball League (Australia) teams
Sports teams in Wollongong
Basketball teams established in 1979
Basketball teams in New South Wales
1979 establishments in Australia